Julian Kostov (born 25 August 1989) is a Bulgarian actor, filmmaker, talent manager, and former professional swimmer based between London and Los Angeles. He starred in the film Another Mother's Son (2017). On television, he is known for his recurring roles in the Sky One series A Discovery of Witches (2018), the Epix series Berlin Station (2018–2019), and the Netflix series Shadow and Bone (2021–present).

Early life and education
Kostov was born in Varna, Bulgaria. His father owns a logistics business and his mother is a judge; he has a younger sister, Lia Kostova. Kostov learned English watching American television as a child.

Kostov attended a Spanish-language high school in Varna, IV Language School Frederic Joliot-Curie, before going to the Netherlands to study International Business at Tilburg University. After two years, he decided to move to the UK and pursue acting, inspired by Heath Ledger's performance in The Dark Knight. Kostov transferred to the University of Wales Institute Cardiff (now Cardiff Metropolitan University) to finish his studies, graduating with a bachelor's degree in Business Studies in 2011. He was admitted to the National Youth Theatre that same year.

Athletics
Kostov holds over 60 medals as a pro swimmer, including a bronze medal at the 2007 Balkan Games. At the age of 12, Kostov became a pentathlon champion for his age group. He was a 10-time National Swimming Champion from 2005 to 2009.  In 2007 and 2008, he was awarded Varna's Sportsmen #6 of the Year, and in 2008 he earned the Master of Sport title in Swimming.

Career
Kostov began his acting career in Bulgarian and British productions, including a two episode guest arc on 24: Live Another Day in 2014. In 2016, he had minor roles in the films Ben-Hur and London Has Fallen. He began doing motion capture and voice acting for video games.

Kostov starred as Feodor "Bill" Burriy in the 2017 independent British war film Another Mother's Son. That same year, he appeared in the American horror film Leatherface. Kostov landed a number of television roles such as Timur in A Discovery of Witches on Sky One, Sergei Basarov in Berlin Station on Epix, and Yuri Leniov in Treadstone. It was announced in 2019 that Kosov would play Fedyor Kaminsky in the Netflix fantasy Shadow and Bone, which premiered in 2021.

In 2014, Kostov founded JupiterLights Productions, a Bulgaria-based production and talent management company. They have since run acting workshops. Their debut feature film The Dare was released in 2019. Jupiter Lights represents Bulgarian actress Maria Bakalova in the United Kingdom. Kostov is also the co-founder of the production company Five Oceans alongside Bakalova.

Personal life 
Kostov speaks Bulgarian, Italian, English, and Spanish.

Filmography

Filmmaking credits
Early Birds (2015) – wrote, produced
The Dare (2019) – produced, second unit director

Film

Television

Video games

Stage

References

External links

Living people
1989 births
21st-century Bulgarian male actors
Bulgarian expatriates in England
Bulgarian expatriates in the United States
Bulgarian filmmakers
Bulgarian male film actors
Bulgarian male modern pentathletes
Bulgarian male swimmers
Bulgarian male television actors
Bulgarian male voice actors
National Youth Theatre members
Actors from Varna, Bulgaria
Sportspeople from Varna, Bulgaria
Talent managers